Miss Grand Vietnam 2022 was the inaugural edition of the Miss Grand Vietnam beauty pageant. It was held on 1 October 2022 in Phú Thọ Indoor Stadium, District 11, Ho Chi Minh City, Đoàn Thiên Ân of Long An was crowned the first ever Miss Grand Vietnam at the end of the event. She represented the country at Miss Grand International 2022, placing in the top 20.

Background

History
The press conference of the contest happened on 8 June 2022 at Sofitel Saigon Plaza Hotel, and was also attended by the president of Miss Grand International Nawat Itsaragrisil and the top 10 finalists of Miss Grand Thailand 2022, the official schedule of the contest was additionally stated on 18 August, which is consisted of the swimsuit contest, Vietnam beauty fashion show, National cultural costume contest, preliminary round, and the final coronation night, all such events will take place from 30 August to 1 October. In particular, the costumes selected by the judges in the national traditional contume contest will become Vietnam's representative attire for Miss Grand International 2022, which will be held in Indonesia.

Originally, under cooperation with the Thanh Hóa Provincial People's Committee, Sen Vang Entertainment planned to arrange the inaugural edition of the Miss Grand Vietnam contest on 6 August 2021 in Thanh Hóa, as the sub-event of the Thanh Hóa Cultural and Tourism Week 2022, with the contestants' registration in late April, a pageant boot camp in May, and the preliminary contest in June, the press conference of such was held on 19 March 2021. However, the event was later cancelled, and the Miss Grand Vietnam 2021 titleholder was appointed instead.

Location and date
The following list is the main event of the Miss Grand Vietnam 2022 pageant, in addition to such, a contest for designers for the creative national costumes section was also held virtually from 6 August to 15 September.

Selection of contestants
The application for the Miss Grand Vietnam 2022 contest was officially started on 5 May and ended on 30 August, only a direct application through the central organizer was accepted, and no regional pageants were held to determine the candidates. During the duration of the registry, an online preliminary selection was also performing, on which the candidates who have submitted their applications was selected and contacted by the organizers to participate in the first round of online prequalification of the contest, the first batch of the qualified candidates was later revealed on 15 August. As of 28 August, 78 candidates qualified for the offline preliminary contest on 30 August to select the final delegates for the national round, many of them were the former contestants of several other national pageants or currently working in the country's entertainment industry, such as: 
 Chế Nguyễn Quỳnh Châu, Top 15 of Miss Universe Vietnam 2015 and Top 5 of Miss Ao Dai 2016 who currently working as an actress, a professional model, and bilingual MCs.
 Ngô Thị Quỳnh Mai also known as Mai Ngô, Top 45 of Miss Universe Vietnam 2015, a runner-up of the Face Vietnam season 1, a contestant of Asia's Next Top Model cycle 4, and Top 70 of Miss Universe Vietnam 2017 but she withdrew due to personal reasons, she currently working as an actress, singer, rapper, dancer, and professional model.
 Trần Tuyết Như, an entrepreneur, model, and model training coach, who has been elected the first runner-up in Miss China-Asean Etiquette 2017, top 11 The Face Vietnam season 3, and Top 16 of Miss Universe Vietnam 2022.
 Vũ Như Quỳnh, a freelance model, who has been crowned Miss Ao Dai 2019, once was placed among the top 5 finalists of the Miss Hanoi, and also reached the top 37 finalists at Miss World Vietnam 2022.

Results summary

Placements
Color keys

$ Voted by viewers into top 10

€ Winner Miss Insprition Award

Special awards

Candidates
50 delegates have been confirmed to participate.

Judges
Hà Kiều Anh - Miss Vietnam 1992, Jury president
Hoàng Nhật Nam - Sen Vàng Productions director, Jury vice-president
Nguyễn Minh Tiệp - Actor
Nguyễn Thúc Thùy Tiên - Miss Grand International 2021 from Vietnam
 Nguyễn Thị Anh Thư - Actress and supermodel
Nguyễn Minh Tú -  Miss Supranational Vietnam 2018,  Asia's Next Top Model cycle 5 Runner-up
Đỗ Long - Fashion designer
Nguyễn Lê Ngọc Thảo - Miss Vietnam 2020 2nd Runner-up and Miss Grand Vietnam 2020
Vũ Văn Tiến - Journalist
Ngô Bá Lục - Journalist
Nicholas Pham - TikTok Vietnam Head of Operations

References

External links

 

Miss Grand Vietnam
Grand Vietnam 2022
2022 in Vietnam